Sunnyside railway station was formerly located at the intersection of King Street, Queen Street West and Roncesvalles Avenue in Toronto, Ontario, Canada. It operated passenger service from 1910 until 1971.

History
The Grand Trunk Railway (GTR) had operated rail lines along the lakeshore of Toronto since 1850. The lines encountered a steep hill into the Parkdale area of Toronto, from the west. In the first decade of the 1900s, the GTR operated the South Parkdale railway station at the intersection of Jameson Avenue and Springhurst Avenue. In 1910, the GTR embarked on a project to create a cut through the Parkdale neighbourhood, eliminating the grade. The railway decided to close the South Parkdale station and build a new one at the foot of Roncesvalles Avenue, in the area commonly known as 'Sunnyside'.

The company built a temporary station, opening service in 1910. A permanent station was completed in 1912. It was situated at street level at the King and Queen Streets intersection. The ticket office and waiting area was at street level, and passengers would walk down staircases to track level. A separate bridge would pass over the tracks for passengers travelling east-bound.

The grade elimination project also removed a level crossing of Queen Street to the Lakeshore Road. The following year a roadway bridge was built over the tracks immediately to the west of the station to connect the Sunnyside intersection with Lakeshore Road. The bridge was eventually demolished in the 1950s to build the Gardiner Expressway project.

The location was well-situated, with access to the popular Sunnyside Amusement Park located nearby and streetcar routes nearby. A coach station, the Sunnyside Bus Terminal, was built across the street in 1936, providing access to motor coaches of the Gray Coach bus lines. The Edgewater Hotel was built next to the bus station on the north-west corner of the intersection in 1939.

The rail lines and service was amalgamated into Canadian National Railways around 1920.

GO Transit began service in May 1967 and took over CN's Toronto to Hamilton route. While CN's Hamilton train had stopped at Sunnyside, GO's Lakeshore West line bypassed the station resulting in a significant drop in its use. CN closed the station in 1971 and its buildings were demolished in 1973.

Legacy

The site of the former station is now Beaty Boulevard Parkette, a small city park. The park is home to Katyń Monument commemorating the 1940 Katyn massacre in Poland.

Current Situation 
The former Sunnyside Station in Toronto is now a city park called Beaty Boulevard Parkette. The park is home to the Katyń Monument, which commemorates the 1940 Katyn massacre in Poland. The station was built by the Grand Trunk Railway in 1910 and was situated at the intersection of King and Queen Streets. It was well-situated, with access to nearby streetcars and the Sunnyside Amusement Park. The station was later taken over by Canadian National Railways, but it was closed and demolished in 1971 after the introduction of GO Transit, which bypassed the station.

Gallery

See also
 Roncesvalles, Toronto
 Sunnyside, Toronto

References

External links

Demolished buildings and structures in Toronto
Railway stations in Toronto
Railway stations in Canada opened in 1910
Grand Trunk Railway stations in Ontario
Railway stations closed in 1971
Buildings and structures completed in 1912
Canadian National Railway stations in Ontario
1912 establishments in Ontario